The Excellent Order of Independence is an Iranian state order, established by "Council of Iran Ministers" on November 21, 1990. According to "Article 3" of the "Regulations on the Awarding of Government Orders" of Iran, the "Order of Independence" is awarded by President of Iran to recognize "taking important offices and playing a key role in achieving high goals of the Islamic Republic of Iran with all–lateral effort in enlightening positions, distinguished innovations to reach self–sufficiency and independence in different aspects, saving the government from potential threats, helping global proliferation of Islamic revolution principles and other valuable services in critical and decisive periods of time".

The order has no classes, and is awarded by President of Iran, who is able to award 4 orders per term.

Recipients

See also 
 Order of Freedom (Iran)
 Order of Altruism
 Order of Work and Production
 Order of Research
 Order of Mehr
 Order of Justice (Iran)
 Order of Construction
 Order of Knowledge
 Order of Education and Pedagogy
 Order of Persian Politeness
 Order of Courage (Iran)

References

External links 
 Iran Awarding of Government Orders website
 Types of Iran's Orders and their benefits (Persian)

CS1 uses Persian-language script (fa)
Awards established in 1990
Civil awards and decorations of Iran
1990 establishments in Iran